This is a list of private and independent high schools in the state of Arizona. For a full list of high schools in the state, see List of high schools in Arizona.

Apache County
St. Michael High School

Coconino County
New Horizon Christian Academy, Flagstaff

Maricopa County

Avondale

St John Paul II Catholic HS

Buckeye
Grace Fellowship Academy

Chandler
Seton Catholic Preparatory High School
Tri-City Christian Academy
HOPE Christian Academy

Gilbert
Gilbert Christian High School

Glendale
Bayer Private School
Joy Christian School
New Gains Academy (Arizona's Best School)

Mesa
Redeemer Christian School
American Family Education

Phoenix
Arizona Cultural Academy
Bourgade Catholic High School
Brophy College Preparatory
Holy Family Academy
New Gains Academy (Arizona's Best School)
North Valley Christian Academy
Northwest Christian School
Paradise Valley Christian Preparatory
Phoenix Christian Junior/Senior High School
Phoenix Country Day School
St. Mary's High School
Scottsdale Christian Academy
Valley Christian High School
Valley Lutheran High School
Xavier College Preparatory

Scottsdale
Bella Vista Private School
Notre Dame Preparatory High School
Rancho Solano Preparatory School
Thunderbird Adventist Academy
Ville de Marie Academy

Surprise
Surprise Christian Academy

Tempe
German School Phoenix
International School of Innovative Studies

Pima County

Oro Valley
Immaculate Heart High School
Pusch Ridge Christian Academy

Tucson
Desert Christian High School
Fenster School
Green Fields Country Day School
International School of Tucson
St. Augustine Catholic High School
The Gregory School
St. Michael's School
Salpointe Catholic High School
San Miguel High School

Pinal County
Canyon State Academy, Queen Creek

Santa Cruz County
Lourdes Catholic School, Nogales

Yavapai County
American Heritage Academy, Cottonwood
Copper Canyon Academy, Rimrock
Mingus Mountain Academy, Prescott Valley
The Orme School of Arizona, Mayer
Spring Ridge Academy, Spring Valley
Verde Valley School, Sedona

Yuma County
Yuma Catholic High School, Yuma

Private